Neula is a type of Catalan biscuit, eaten traditionally in Christmas with cava (Catalan champagne) and torró. They are often dipped into cava. It consists of a very thin sheet of a mixture of egg whites, butter, sugar and flour, flavoured with lemon and rolled. At present there are some other popular versions, as neules stuffed with torró de Xixona or others covered with a chocolate lay. At present, although they are typical on Christmas, they can sometimes be eaten during the rest of the year, for example with crema catalana or ice creams.

Origin
The noun neula comes from Latin nebula, meaning fog, because of its fine and light texture. Some documents show that neules existed before torró, and torró has been shown to exist at least in the Middle Ages and was eaten, for example, at Jaume I's daughter's wedding.

Elaboration
Making neules at home, because of their lightness and slimness, is not easy so they are usually bought by Catalonians in professional patisseries. Nevertheless, some people do make them.

Other products
In Belgium there are gaufres that, even though they are much thicker and flat, have the same origin as neules. The same origin have other some stuffed or not waffles, as Dutch stroopwafels. In other regions of Spain there are a sort of rolled biscuits called "barquillos", but they are very much stronger, harder and thicker than waffles and neules, bigger than neules and they taste different.

See also
Catalan cuisine
Pirouline

References

Biscuits
Catalan cuisine
Christmas food
Articles containing video clips